Jonathan Gottschall (born September 20, 1972) is an American literary scholar specializing in literature and evolution. He holds the title of Research Fellow in the English department of  Washington & Jefferson College in Pennsylvania. He is the author or editor of seven books.

Education
He completed graduate work in English at State University of New York at Binghamton, where he worked under David Sloan Wilson.

Recognition
Gottschall was profiled by The New York Times and The Chronicle of Higher Education.  His work was featured in an article in Science describing literature and evolution.

Selected works
His work The Rape of Troy: Evolution, Violence and the World of Homer describes the Homeric epic poems Iliad and  Odyssey in terms of evolutionary psychology, with the central violent conflicts in these works driven by the lack of young women to marry and the resulting evolutionary legacy, as opposed to the violent conflicts being driven by honor or wealth.

Literature, Science and a New Humanities advocates that the humanities, and literary studies in particular, need to avail themselves of quantitative and objective methods of inquiry as well as the traditional qualitative and subjective, if they are to produce cumulative, progressive knowledge, and provides a number of case studies that apply quantitative methods to fairy and folk tale around the world to answer questions about human universals and differences.

Gottschall's book, The Storytelling Animal: How Stories Make Us Human (Houghton Mifflin 2012), is about the evolutionary mystery of storytelling—about the way we shape stories, and stories shape us.  A review by The Virginian-Pilot said "Gottschall assesses and accounts for that powerful narrative attraction in a compelling chronicle of his own...and it is a certifiable knee-slap, three-pipe, blue-moon ripsnorter. The Storytelling Animal was a New York Times Editor's Choice selection and a finalist for the Los Angeles Times Book Prize.

In the book The Professor in the Cage: Why Men Fight and Why We Like to Watch (Penguin 2015), Gottschall describes the three years he spent at a Mixed Martial Arts (MMA) gym trying to learn how to fight. He uses this experience as a way to explore the evolutionary psychology of violence, masculinity, and sports.

In 2021, Gottschall published The Story Paradox: How Our Love of Storytelling Builds Societies and Tears Them Down. The book received a harshly critical review by Timothy D. Snyder in the New York Times. This led to letters to the editor by both Steven Pinker, his work also being critically in the article, as well as Gottschall.

List of works
 The Literary Animal: Evolution and the Nature of Narrative (2005) – edited with David Sloan Wilson.   
 The Rape of Troy: Evolution, Violence and the World of Homer (2008)
 Literature, Science and a New Humanities (2008)
 Evolution, Literature and Film: A Reader (2010) – co-edited with Brian Boyd and Joseph Carroll.
   Graphing Jane Austen: The Evolutionary Basis of Literary Meaning (2012). Co-authored with Joseph Carroll, John A. Johnson, and Daniel Kruger.
 The Storytelling Animal: How Stories Make us Human (2012) 
 The Professor in the Cage: Why Men Fight and Why We Like to Watch (2015)
 The Story Paradox: How Our Love of Storytelling Builds Societies and Tears Them Down (2021)

References

External links
Jonathan Gottschall's Web Page

Living people
American literary theorists
Washington & Jefferson College faculty
Binghamton University alumni
1972 births